Vladimir Vladimirovich Kunin (Владимир Владимирович Кунин) (actually Vladimir Feinberg, June 19, 1927, Leningrad - 4 February 2011, Munich) was a Russian writer, playwright and screenwriter. Kunin was a member of the Union of Cinematographers of the Russian Federation, the Russian Union of Writers (Союз писателей России) as well as an honorary member of the International association of writers and publicists (Международная ассоциация писателей и публицистов).

1927 births
2011 deaths
Writers from Saint Petersburg